Blue Bend Forest Camp, also known as Blue Bend Recreation Area, is a historic recreational area near Alvon, West Virginia. The site was planned and developed by the Civilian Conservation Corps from 1936 to 1938 and is one of four CCC-built recreational areas in Monongahela National Forest. Anthony Creek runs through the camp, and a pool on the creek known as Blue Hole is a fishing area and one of the main features of the site. Blue Bend Forest Camp also includes log picnic shelters and twenty-one campsites. The camp was added to the National Register of Historic Places on April 20, 1994.

References

External links
Monongahela National Forest - Blue Bend Recreational Area and Campground

National Register of Historic Places in Greenbrier County, West Virginia
Bungalow architecture in West Virginia
American Craftsman architecture in West Virginia
Buildings and structures in Greenbrier County, West Virginia
Civilian Conservation Corps in West Virginia
Protected areas of Greenbrier County, West Virginia
Campgrounds in West Virginia
Historic districts in Greenbrier County, West Virginia
Monongahela National Forest
Civilian Conservation Corps camps
Historic districts on the National Register of Historic Places in West Virginia
Temporary populated places on the National Register of Historic Places
1938 establishments in West Virginia
Protected areas established in 1938